Endre Szervánszky (December 27, 1911June 25, 1977) was a Hungarian composer.

Biography
Szervánszky was born in Kistétény and studied the clarinet at the Budapest Academy of Music (1922–7). He played in various orchestras before returning to the academy to study composition with Albert Siklós (1931–6). He then worked as an orchestrator for the Hungarian Radio and taught musical theory. He was appointed professor of composition at the Budapest Academy in 1948.

Szervánszky first came to public attention with his First String Quartet (1936–8) and his works of this period were influenced by his compatriots, Zoltán Kodály and Béla Bartók.  Works for this time include the Clarinet Serenade (1950) and the Flute Concerto (1952–3).

From the early 1950s Szervánszky embarked on a series of larger compositions, one of the longest being the Concerto for Orchestra in memory of Attila József. Each of the concerto's five movements is based on a quotation from József. The fourth has folk music elements and the whole demonstrates the influence of Bartók. Both the String Quartet no.2 (1956–7) and the Wind Quintet no.2 (1957) also demonstrate the composer's increasing interest in serialism.

For his Six Orchestra Pieces, composed in 1959, Szervánszky employed 12-note serialism and the piece is particular in its use of percussion. Szervánszky did not compose another major work until 1963 – the oratorio Requiem, based on a text by János Pilinszky which takes the concentration camp of Auschwitz as its theme. Works which followed include the Variations (1964) and the Clarinet Concerto (1965).

Endre Szervánszky was given the "Righteous Among the Nations" award by the State of Israel to honour non-Jews who risked their lives to save Jews from the Nazis.

He was the brother of artist Jenö Szervánszky and violinist Peter Szervánszky and the uncle of Valeria Szervánszky.

He died in Budapest.

Notable students 
 Ákos Rózmann

Works

Stage and vocal works

Napkeleti mese – “Oriental Tale”, (a "dance play") 1948–9
Népdalszvit – “Folksong Suite”, 1949
Honvédkantáta – “Soldier’s Cantata”, 1949
Tavaszi Szél – “Spring Breeze” (cantata), 1950
8 Petőfi Songs, 1951
3 Petőfi Choruses, 1953
3 Songs, 1956–7
3 Male Choruses (ancient China), 1958
Requiem – “Dark Heaven” to words by János Pilinszky (oratorio), 1963 
Az éj – “The Night” (cantata), 1974–5

Orchestra

3 divertimentos, 1939, 1942, 1943
Serenade, strings, 1947–8
Rhapsody, 1950
Serenade for clarinet and orchestra, 1950
Flute Concerts, 1952–3
Concerts for Orchestra, 1954
6 Orchestral Pieces, 1959
Variations, 1964
Clarinet Concerto, 1965

Chamber

String Quartet no.1, 1936–8
20 Little Duos for 2 violins, 1941
Sonata for violin and piano, 1945
25 Duos for 2 violins, 1946
Trio for flute, violin and viola, 1951
Sonatina for flute, and piano, 1952
Wind Quintet no.1, 1953
5 Koncert etűd – “5 Concert Etudes” for flute, 1956
Suite for 2 flutes, 1956
String Quartet No.2, 1956–7
Wind Quintet no.2, 1957
2 Duos for 2 flutes, 1972
7 Studies for flute, 1974–5

Piano

Folksong Suite, 4 hands, 1935
Little Suite, 1939
Sonatina, 1941
Sonatina, 4 hands, 1950

References

Don Randel, The Harvard Biographical Dictionary of Music. Harvard, 1996, p. 895.

1911 births
1977 deaths
20th-century classical composers
Hungarian classical composers
Hungarian male classical composers
Artists of Merit of the Hungarian People's Republic
Hungarian Righteous Among the Nations
20th-century Hungarian male musicians